Kthellë is a former municipality in the Lezhë County, northwestern Albania. At the 2015 local government reform it became a subdivision of the municipality Mirditë. The population at the 2011 census was 2,209. The largest village in the municipal unit is Perlat. It was once in the center of the old Oheri district of early 20th century Albania, but this district was later divided between Mirdita and Mati.

Since 2015, Kthelle forms part of the new Kthella Regional Nature Park adjacent to the Oroshi Mt Protected Area.

Notable people 
Pjetër Perlati, commander of the League of Lezhë

References

Former municipalities in Lezhë County
Administrative units of Mirditë